The 2021 Next Generation ATP Finals (also known as the Intesa Sanpaolo Next Gen ATP Finals for sponsorship reasons) was a men's exhibition tennis tournament for the best singles players on the 2021 ATP Tour who were age 21 and under. It ran from 9 to 13 November 2021 in Milan, Italy at the PalaLido and was the fourth edition of the event.

Carlos Alcaraz defeated Sebastian Korda in the final, 4–3(7–5), 4–2, 4–2, to win the title. For the second consecutive occasion, the title was won by the youngest player in the draw.

Jannik Sinner was the defending champion from when the event was last held in 2019, but withdrew from the event before competition began.

Qualified players
On 14 September 2021, the first four qualifiers were announced: Jannik Sinner, Félix Auger-Aliassime, Sebastian Korda, and Carlos Alcaraz. On 22 October 2021, Jenson Brooksby was announced as the fifth qualifier. Lorenzo Musetti was announced as the sixth qualifier on 24 October 2021. Brandon Nakashima was announced seventh on 30 October 2021. After Auger-Aliassime withdrew from the tournament, the ATP announced Juan Manuel Cerúndolo as the next qualifier on 1 November 2021. Cerúndolo is the first player from South America to qualify in the tournament's history. Brooksby withdrew due to injury on 2 November 2021 and Sebastián Báez qualified later that day. After Sinner's withdrawal, Holger Rune was announced by the ATP as the next qualifier on 4 November 2021. Hugo Gaston was announced as the final qualifier on 5 November 2021.

Qualification
The top eight players in the ATP Race to Milan will qualify. Eligible players have to be 21 or under at the start of the year (born in 2000 or later for the 2021 edition).

 Qualification will only count events and points played in 2021. A player's year-end position may not coincide with his ATP ranking, which can include "best of" results from 2020.

Results

Final
  Carlos Alcaraz def.  Sebastian Korda, 4–3(7–5), 4–2, 4–2

Seeds

Draw

Finals

Group A

Group B

Standings are determined by: 1. number of wins; 2. number of matches; 3. in two-players-ties, head-to-head records; 4. in three-players-ties, percentage of sets won, then percentage of games won, then head-to-head records; 5. ATP rankings.

See also
2021 ATP Tour

References

External links

Draw

2021
2021 ATP Tour
2021 tennis exhibitions
2021 Next Generation ATP Finals
2021 in Italian tennis
November 2021 sports events in Italy